Cave Hollow is a valley in Hickman County, Tennessee, in the United States.

Cave Hollow was named from the presence of a cave at its mouth.

References

Landforms of Hickman County, Tennessee
Valleys of Tennessee